O'Reilly is a surname of Irish origin.

O'Reilly may also refer to:

Fictional characters 
Radar O'Reilly, character in the book, film, and television show M*A*S*H
Mr. O'Reilly, character/builder portrayed by Irish actor David Kelly on the episode "The Builders" from Fawlty Towers

Businesses 
O'Reilly Auto Parts, American automobile parts chain
O'Reilly Raceway Park, an auto racing venue in Indianapolis, Indiana
O'Reilly Media, American publisher and media company

Places 
O'Reilly, Queensland, Australia

Other uses 
 O'Reilly (horse), a New Zealand racehorse
O'Reilly Foundation, a private charity
O'Reilly Open Source Convention, annual convention for the discussion of open source software
The O'Reilly Factor, American political talk show

See also 
Reilly (disambiguation)
Riley (disambiguation)
Ó Raghallaigh
O'Riley